This is a list of content libraries and catalogs owned by The Walt Disney Company.

List of content libraries

Walt Disney Studios 
Walt Disney Pictures
 Oswald the Lucky Rabbit (character and Walt Disney shorts; later shorts retained by Universal Pictures)
 True-Life Adventures - early documentary series
 Touchstone Pictures
DreamWorks II Distribution Co. LLC, film rights acquired from DreamWorks and Reliance. Disney received the 2011–2016 DreamWorks Pictures 14-film library in compensation for the outstanding loan.
 Hollywood Pictures
Caravan Pictures
 Cinergi Pictures (less Deep Rising and An Alan Smithee Film: Burn Hollywood Burn)
 Disneynature
 Buena Vista International
 Star Distribution
 Walt Disney Animation Studios
 Disneytoon Studios
 Pixar (company and) library acquired in 2006 in an all stock deal.
 Marvel Studios (excluding The Incredible Hulk, released by Universal Pictures, and the Spider-Man movies (Homecoming, Far From Home and No Way Home), released by Columbia Pictures)
 Marvel Television (excluding Mutant X, owned by Lionsgate)
 Marvel Animation (excluding the Marvel Anime sub-series, owned by Sony Pictures Entertainment Japan, and the international distribution rights to certain shows)
Lucasfilm, including Lucasfilm Animation, excluding movies owned by third-party companies
 20th Century Studios (including Fox 2000 Pictures, Fox Atomic/Fox Atomic Comics, and Fox Faith)
 Searchlight Pictures
 20th Century Animation (including Fox Animation Studios and Blue Sky Studios)
Sullivan Bluth Studios (only films that 20th Century Fox/20th Century Studios purchased from Warner Bros., including non-U.S. distribution rights to The Pebble and the Penguin, although U.S. rights and the film itself are owned by Metro-Goldwyn-Mayer)
 Third-party animated films for 20th Century Fox/20th Century Studios (excluding the 2013–2017 DreamWorks Animation library, which is now owned by Universal Pictures, and the Terrytoons library, which is now owned by Paramount Pictures)
 Fox Film, excluding movies in the public domain
 Twentieth Century Pictures, excluding movies in the public domain
 20th Digital Studio
 New World Pictures (post-1989)
 Regency Enterprises (only films co-produced with 20th Century Studios and some pre-1999 films released by Warner Bros. and other distributors) 
 Fox Digital Entertainment
 The Muppets Studio - acquired from The Jim Henson Company in 2004. (excluding Muppets-related films produced for Sony Pictures Entertainment)
 Studio Ghibli (home media distribution in Japan, China and Taiwan)
 Disney Music Group (Disneyland Records) discography
 Walt Disney Records
 Hollywood Records
 Fox Music
 DMG Nashville
 Mammoth Records
 Lyric Street Records
 Carolwood Records
 Disney Theatrical Group
 Buena Vista Theatrical/Fox Stage Productions
 Hyperion Theatricals
 Maker Studios/Disney Digital Network

Television Entertainment 

 A&E Networks (50% joint)
 Lifetime Entertainment Services

 ABC Signature (formerly Touchstone Television and ABC Studios)
 Walt Disney Television, including:
 Disney Telefilms
 American Broadcasting Companies (excluding the pre-1973 ABC Films library, owned by CBS Media Ventures)
 ABC News
 ABC Audio/ABC Radio
 Greengrass Productions (excluding Hypernauts, owned by WildBrain)
 ABC Circle Films
 ABC Motion Pictures
 ABC Productions
 ABC Pictures
 ABC Pictures International
 Palomar Pictures International
 Selmur Productions/Pictures
 Selznick International Pictures/Vanguard Films (excluding A Star is Born and Gone with the Wind, owned by Warner Bros., with ownership of the latter handled through Turner Entertainment Co.)
 Valleycrest Productions
 ABC Owned Television Stations
 ABC Signature
 20th Television
 20th Television Animation
 Regency Television (post-1998)
 Touchstone Television (formerly Fox 21 Television Studios)
 Fox Television Studios
 Fox Television Studios International/Fox World
 Fox Lab
 Foxstar Productions
 Fox 21
 Metromedia Producers Corporation  
 FNM Films
 New World Television (post-1989, excluding  Get a Life, owned by Sony Pictures Television)
 Four Star Television (excluding Wanted Dead or Alive, owned by StudioCanal)
 Gold Key Entertainment
 Genesis Entertainment (excluding Tales from the Crypt, owned by Warner Bros. Television Studios)
 MTM Enterprises (excluding The Trials of Rosie O'Neill, owned by Multicom Entertainment Group)
 20th Television (old iteration, syndication company)
 ESPN Inc.
 Big Fights, Inc.
 ESPN Books
 Disney Channel
 Disney Junior
 Disney XD
 Disney Television Animation
 National Geographic
 FX Productions
 Freeform (previously ABC Family Worldwide, Fox Family Worldwide, and International Family Entertainment)
 Television South
 BVS Entertainment (formerly Saban Entertainment, excluding franchises sold to third-party companies and some co-productions)
 Fox Children's Network, Inc./Jetix
 Marvel Productions/New World Animation (excluding non-Marvel/Muppets third-party productions)
 DePatie–Freleng Enterprises (excluding non-Marvel/Fox third-party productions, including those for United Artists)
 Créativité et Développement
 BVS International N.V. (formerly Fox Kids International Programming)
 Jetix Europe Properties S.A.R.L.
 Jetix Animation Concepts
 Radio Disney
 SOAPnet

Marvel Entertainment 
 Marvel Comics
 Magazine Management
 Humorama
 Atlas Comics
 Timely Comics
 Malibu Comics
 Malibu Interactive/Acme Interactive library (excluding ports and games for Namco (Battle Cars and Wings 2: Aces High), EA (Hard Nova), etc.)
 Aircel Comics
 Eternity Comics
 Adventure Publications
 Star Comics
 Marvel Books
 Amalgam Comics (co-owned with DC Comics)
 Epic Comics
 CrossGen
 Marvel Music
 Welsh Publishing Group
 Marvel Press
 Marvel Toys
 Toy Biz

Disney Publishing Worldwide 
 Disney Comics
Disney Press
 Hyperion Books (except Hyperion's adult trade list, sold to Hachette)
 Disney-Hyperion

Disney Media and Entertainment Distribution 
 Hulu LLC
 Steamboat Willie Productions
 UTV Software Communications
 Star India
 Star Studios film library
 The Walt Disney Company India
 SIP Animation
 BabyTV
 Patagonik Film Group

Disney Interactive library 
 Disney Interactive Studios
 Wideload Games
 Disney Online
 Playdom
 Disney Mobile
 LucasArts
 Starwave
 Infoseek Corporation
 FoxNext
 Fox Interactive
 Fox Video Games, Inc.
 20th Century Games

Music publishing 

 ABC Circle Music Inc. (BMI)
 ABC Family Music Publishing (BMI)
 Agarita Music	(ASCAP)
 American Broadcasting Music Inc. (ASCAP)
 Bantha Music (BMI)
 Birch Street Music (ASCAP)
 Buena Vista Music Co. (BMI)
 Falferious Music (BMI)
 FFM Publishing (ASCAP)
 Five Hundred South Songs (SESAC)
 Fox Film Music Corporation (BMI)
 Fuzzy Muppet Songs (ASCAP)
 Holpic Music, Inc. (BMI)
 Hollywood Pictures Music (ASCAP)
 Mad Muppet Melodies (BMI)
 Marvel Characters Music (BMI)
 Marvel Comics Music (ASCAP)
 Marvel Hero Tunes (SESAC)
 Marvel Superhero Music (BMI)
 Middle Street Music (BMI)
 Pixar Music (BMI)
 Pixar Talking Pictures (ASCAP)
 Pixar Tunes (SESAC)
 Ronzo Road Music (SESAC)
 Seven Peaks Music (ASCAP)
 Hobbitville Music (ASCAP)
 Vistaville Music (ASCAP)
 Seven Summits Music (BMI)
 TCF Music Publishing Inc. (ASCAP)
 Touchstone Pictures Music & Songs, Inc. (ASCAP)
 Twentieth Tunes Music Inc. (SESAC)
 Utapau Music (BMI)
 Walt Disney Music Company (ASCAP)
 Wampa-Tauntaun Music (ASCAP)
 Wonderland Music Company Inc. (BMI)

See also 
List of ABC programs
List of 20th Television programs
List of Freeform original films
List of programs produced by ABC Signature
List of assets owned by The Walt Disney Company

References

Disney
Disney-related lists